The Panchayat raj is a political system, originating from the Indian subcontinent, found mainly in India, Pakistan, Bangladesh, Sri Lanka, and Nepal. It is the oldest system of local government in the Indian subcontinent, and historical mentions date to the 250 CE period. The word raj means "rule" and panchayat means "assembly" (ayat) of five (panch). Traditionally, Panchayats consisted of wise and respected elders chosen and accepted by the local community. These assemblies settled disputes between both individuals and villages. However, there were varying forms of such assemblies. 

The leader of the Panchayat was often called the president  mukhiya, sarpanch, or pradhan, an elected or generally acknowledged position. The modern Panchayati Raj of India and its gram panchayats are neither to be confused with the traditional system nor with the extra-constitutional khap panchayats (or caste panchayats) found in parts of northern India.

Mahatma Gandhi advocated panchayat raj as the foundation of India's political system. It would have been a decentralised form of government, where each village would be responsible for its own affairs. The term for such a vision was Gram Swaraj ("village self-governance"). Instead, India developed a highly centralised system of government. However, this has been moderated by the delegation of several administrative functions to the local level, empowering elected gram panchayats. There are significant differences between the traditional Panchayati Raj system, the system envisioned by Gandhi, and the system formalised in India in 1992.

In the Indian subcontinent

Early history

In the time of the Rigveda (1700 BC), evidences suggest that self-governing village bodies called 'sabhas' existed. With the passage of time, these bodies became panchayats (council of five persons). Panchayat were functional institutions of grassroots governance in almost every village. The Village Panchayat or elected council had large ers, both executive and judicial. Land was distributed by this panchayat which also collected taxes out of the produce and paid the government's share on behalf of the village. Above a number of these village councils there was a larger panchayat or council to supervise and interfere if necessary. Casteism and feudalistic system of governance under Mughal rule in the medieval period slowly eroded the self-government in villages. A new class of feudal chiefs and revenue collectors (zamindars) emerged between the ruler and the people. And, so began the stagnation and decline of self-government in villages.

A detailed account of how a medieval south Indian village council functioned was carved into a temple wall in Uthiramerur, a village in Tamil Nadu some 85km westof Chennai. Thirty councilmembers were chosen by lot, a form of sortition. Males were eligible for selection if they were of good character and met a set of requirements based on landholdings and knowledge of Hindu scriptures. They were then assigned to various committees in charge of irrigation works, gardens and other matters.

During British rule

The British were not generally concerned with local administration, but left that to the local rulers, and thus didn't interfere with existing panchayati systems, nor induce the rulers to consider more democratic institutions at the local level. The rulers were interested in the creation of 'controlled' local bodies, which could help them in their trading interests by collecting taxes for them. When the colonial administration came under severe financial pressure after the 1857 uprising, decentralization was sought by transferring responsibility for road and public works to local bodies. However, the thrust of this 'compelled' decentralization was with respect to municipal administration.

"The panchayat was destroyed by the East India Company when it was granted the office of Diwan in 1765 in Bengal by the nawab as part of reparation after his defeat at Buxar. As Diwan the Company took two decisions. The first was that it abolished the village land record office and created a company official called Patwari. The Patwari became the official record keeper for a number of villages. The second was the creation of the office of magistrate and the abolition of village police. The magistrate carried out policing functions through the Darogha who had always been a state functionary under the Faujdar. The primary purpose of these measures was the collection of land revenue by fiat. The depredations of the Patwari and the Darogha are part of our folklore and it led to the worst famine in Bengal. The effects of the famine lingered right to the end of the 18th century. These two measures completely disempowered the village community and destroyed the panchayat. After 1857 the British tried to restore the panchayat by giving it powers to try minor offences and to resolve village disputes. But these measures never restored the lost powers of the village community."

From 1870 when the Viceroy’s Lord Mayo's Resolution (for decentralization of power to bring about administrative efficiency in meeting people's demand and to add to the finances of colonial regime) gave the needed impetus to the development of local institutions. It was a landmark in the evolution of colonial policy towards local government. The real bench marking of the government policy on decentralization can, however, be attributed to Lord Ripon who, in his famous resolution on local self-government on May 18, 1882, recognized the twin considerations of local government: (i) administrative efficiency and (ii) political education.
The Ripon Resolution, which focused on towns, provided for local bodies consisting of a large majority of elected non-official members and presided over by a non-official chairperson. This resolution met with resistance from colonial administrators. The progress of local self-government was tardy with only half- hearted steps taken in setting up municipal bodies. Rural decentralization remained a neglected area of administrative reform.

The Royal Commission on Decentralization (1907) under the chairmanship of Sir H. W. Primrose recognized the importance of panchayats at the village level. The commission recommended that "it is most desirable, alike in the interests of decentralization and in order to associate the people with the local tasks of administration, that an attempt should be made to constitute and develop village panchayats for the administration of local village affairs."

But, the Montague-Chemsford reforms (1919) brought local self-government as a provincial transferred subject, under the domain of Indian ministers in the provinces. Due to organisational and fiscal constraints, the reform was unable to make panchayat institutions truly democratic and vibrant. However, the most significant development of this period was the 'establishment of village panchayats in a number of provinces, that were no longer mere ad hoc judicial tribunal, but representative institutions symbolising the corporate character of the village and having a wide jurisdiction in respect of civic matters'. l By 1925, eight provinces had passed panchayat acts and by 1926, six native states had also passed panchayat laws.

The provincial autonomy under the Government of India Act, 1935, marked the evolution of panchayats in India. Popularly elected governments in provinces enacted legislations to further democratize institutions of local self-government. But the system of responsible government at the grassroots level was least responsible. D.P. Mishra, the then minister for local self-government under the Government of India Act of 1935 in Central Provinces was of the view that 'the working of our local bodies... in our province and perhaps in the whole country presents a tragic picture... 'Inefficiency' and 'local body' have become synonymous terms....'.

In spite of various committees such as the Royal Commission on Decentralization (1907), the report of Montague and Chemsford on constitutional reform (1919), the Government of India Resolution (1919), etc., a hierarchical administrative structure based on supervision and control evolved. The administrator became the focal point of rural governance. The British were not concerned with decentralized democracy but were aiming for colonial objectives.

The Indian National Congress from the 1920s to 1947, emphasized the issue of all-India Swaraj, and organized movements for Independence under the leadership of Mahatma Gandhi. The task of preparing any sort of blueprint for the local level was neglected as a result. There was no consensus among the top leaders regarding the status and role to be assigned to the institution of rural local self-government; rather there were divergent views on the subject. On the one end Gandhi favoured Village Swaraj and strengthening the village panchayat to the fullest extent and on the other end, Dr. B.R. Ambedkar opposed this idea. He believed that the village represented regressive India, a source of oppression. The model state hence had to build safeguards against such social oppression and the only way it could be done was through the adoption of the parliamentary model of politics.
During the drafting of the Constitution of India, Panchayati Raj Institutions were placed in the non-justiciable part of the Constitution, the Directive Principles of State Policy, as Article 40. The Article read 'the State shall take steps to organize village panchayats and endow them with such powers and authority as may be necessary to enable them to function as units of self-government'. However, no worthwhile legislation was enacted either at the national or state level to implement it.

In the four decades since the adoption of the Constitution, panchayat raj institutions have travelled from the non-justiciable part of the Constitution to one where, through a separate amendment, a whole new status has been added to their history.

Post-Independence period
Panchayat raj had to go through various stages. The First Five Year Plan failed to bring about active participation and involvement of the people in the Plan processes, which included Plan formulation implementation and monitoring. The Second Five Year Plan attempted to cover the entire countryside with National Extensive Service Blocks through the institutions of Block Development Officers, Assistant Development Officers, Village Level Workers, in addition to nominated representatives of village panchayats of that area and some other popular organisations like co-operative societies. But the plan failed to satisfactorily accomplish decentralisation. Hence, committees were constituted by various authorities to advise the Centre on different aspects of decentralisation.

At least in part to provide the Gandhian goal of direct political participation of people at the grass root level, in 1957, the National Development Council appointed a committee under Balwant Rai Mehta, which submitted its report in 1958 in which it recommended:-
》A 3-tier structure consisting of Zila Parishad at the District level, Panchayat Samiti at the Block level and Gram Panchayat at the village level.

The next major change in the panchayat system of India came in the form of the passage of the Panchayati Raj Act (73rd Amendment) in 1992. A key motivation of this act was the belief that local governments may be better placed than centrally appointed bureaucrats to identify and respond to the needs of the village. Hence, this act was an important part of India's move towards decentralization.

The main features of this act are: (a) a 3-tier system of Panchayati Raj for all States having population of over 20 lakh; (b) Panchayat elections regularly every 5 years; (c) reservation of seats for Scheduled Castes, Scheduled Tribes and women (not less than one-third of seats); (d) appointment of State Finance Commission to make recommendations as regards the financial powers of the Panchayats. Hence, in theory, panchayats have been given sufficient authority to function as institutions of self-governance and aid social justice.

There were several positive effects of this amendment, some of which have been listed above. However, there is also evidence of deeply ingrained vote-trading structures maintained through extra-political means. This can potentially be blamed on the fact that Gram Sabhas have not been sufficiently empowered and strengthened to ensure greater people's participation and transparency in functioning of Panchayats as envisaged in the Panchayat Act.

See also
 Panchayat (Nepal)

References

Further reading
 

Forms of local government